Sara Sutherland (born January 31, 1992) is an American middle-distance and long-distance runner. While attending the University of Texas and University of Colorado, Sara Sutherland was a four-time NCAA Division 1 All-American cross country and Track and field runner.

Highland Park High School
Sara Sutherland won the 2007 Texas University Interscholastic League 4A Cross Country Championship. She was named the 2009 Texas Girls Coaches Association Cross Country Athlete of the Year.

NCAA
Sara Sutherland, a four-time NCAA Division 1 All-American in Track and field, graduated BA  from University of Texas at Austin and has completed work on her MA in Technology for Global Development at the University of Colorado, Boulder.

International
Sara Sutherland qualified to represent . She competed in Athletics at the 2015 Summer Universiade – Women's 5000 metres where she placed 5th.

USA National Championships

Track and field

Reference list

External links
 Sara Sutherland - Cross Country - University of Colorado Athletics
 Sara Sutherland - Track and Field - University of Colorado Athletics
 Sara Sutherland - Track & Field / Cross Country - University of Texas Athletics
 
 
 
 
 Sara Sutherland at All-Athletics 

1992 births
Living people
American female middle-distance runners
Sportspeople from Texas
American female long-distance runners
University of Texas alumni
University of Colorado alumni
21st-century American women